Vodyanoye is a rural locality in Vinnikovsky Selsoviet Rural Settlement, Kursky District, Kursk Oblast, Russia. Population:

Geography 
The village is located 118 km from the Russia–Ukraine border, 21 km north-east of the district center – the town Kursk, 4 km from the selsoviet center – 1st Vinnikovo.

 Climate
Vodyanoye has a warm-summer humid continental climate (Dfb in the Köppen climate classification).

Transport 
Vodyanoye is located 15 km from the federal route  (Kursk – Voronezh –  "Kaspy" Highway; a part of the European route ), 3.5 km from the road of regional importance  (Kursk – Kastornoye), on the road of intermunicipal significance  (1st Vinnikovo – Vodyanoye), 4 km from the nearest railway halt 29 km (railway line Kursk – 146 km).

The rural locality is situated 20 km from Kursk Vostochny Airport, 132 km from Belgorod International Airport and 185 km from Voronezh Peter the Great Airport.

References

Notes

Sources

Rural localities in Kursky District, Kursk Oblast